The Last Heroes ( or Toot Too Ku Chart, literally: "national liberation ladyboys") is a 2018 Thai action comedy film directed by M Mass Team (pseudonym of Poj Arnon). It is a spoof of the Bang Rajan in 2000.

Storyline
A group of kathoey (Thai transgender) volunteers to spy in an enemy's city. To protect their homeland, village, family and friends, they have to find out the date that the enemy will attack.

Cast
Mum Jokmok as Faeng
Kohtee Aramboy as Duen
Tik Klinsee as Hom
Jim Chuanchuen as Gon
Nongbew Kawkong as Soi
Yong Armchair as Krai
Aukkarat Jittasiri as Boonthung
Rangsan Panyaruen (Songkran The Voice) as Saeng
Rattapoom Toekongsap (Film Rattapoom) as Mangtra Bureng
Nappon Gomarachun as Anawrahta
Arnon Saisangchan (Pu Black Head) as Yasodravati general

Music

Original soundtrack
"Toot Too Ku Chart" (ตุ๊ดตู่กู้ชาติ; "The Last Heroes"), ending theme by Tachaya "Keng" Prathumwan
"La Rak" (ลารัก; "Farewell Love") by Thanasit "Ton" Jaturaput
"Sang Chan" (แสงจันทร์; "Moonlight") by Pu Black Head
Original version by Maleehuana
"Duen Pen" (เดือนเพ็ญ; "Full Moon") by Jennifer Kim
Lyrics by Asanee Poljantra
"Trab Sin Lom Hai Jai" (ตราบสิ้นลมหายใจ; "Until The Breath Ends") by Yong Armchair

Production
It took two years to create. The main filming location is Kanchanaburi.

References

External links
 

Thai-language films
Kathoey
Thai LGBT-related films
Thai action comedy films
Transgender-related films
2018 action comedy films
Films directed by Poj Arnon
2018 LGBT-related films